Elliot Paul Benyon (born 29 August 1987) is an English footballer who plays for Slough Town as a striker.

Career
Benyon began his career as a trainee at Bristol City after being spotted playing local football in High Wycombe. Despite making no first team appearances for the club, impressive loan spells to National Conference sides St Albans City and Crawley Town in the 2006–07 season caught the eye of Paul Buckle, who signed Benyon in June 2007 to play for Torquay United, who had themselves just been relegated from the Football League.

Despite struggling to gain a regular starting place in his first season with the Gulls, Benyon still managed a total of 22 appearances, scoring five times in the 2007–08 season and also made a second-half substitute appearance at Wembley in Torquay's 1–0 defeat to Ebbsfleet United in the 2008 FA Trophy final.

Benyon found more regular places in the starting line-up for Torquay in the 2008–09 season, making a total of 36 league appearances. The season culminated with a second Wembley appearance in two years for both Benyon and Torquay United when the Gulls beat Cambridge United 2–0 in the Conference National Play-off final in May 2009 to regain a place back in the Football League. Cambridge defender Phil Bolland was sent off for a foul on Benyon.

In July 2009, Benyon agreed a fresh one-year contract with the newly promoted Gulls and became an important first team player as his 15 goals in all competitions helped Torquay survive a difficult first season back in League Two. He scored 14 goals by the middle of the 2010–11 season and in January 2011 joined League One Swindon Town for an undisclosed fee, signing a two-and-a-half-year contract after The Robins sold Charlie Austin to Burnley. He scored an injury time equaliser on his debut against Rochdale. At the end of that season, Swindon were relegated to League Two and on 20 June 2011, Benyon was signed on a season long loan by his home town club Wycombe Wanderers, who had themselves just been promoted to League One. He made his debut as a 66th minute replacement for Gareth Ainsworth in a 1–1 away draw against Colchester United, and scored his first goal in the League Cup against Nottingham Forest.

Benyon signed for League Two club Southend United in January 2012 for an undisclosed fee. He started his first game for Southend on 2 January, against Dagenham & Redbridge, before being substituted late on for Neil Harris. He found first team opportunities limited at Southend and in February 2013 rejoined former club Torquay United on a month's loan with an option to extend the deal to the end of the season. He was then released by Southend at the end of the season, before rejoining Torquay permanently in July 2013.

In January 2015 Benyon joined Hayes & Yeading United on loan, signing permanently for the Conference South side at the end of the season. In the 2015–2016 season, Benyon was leading goalscorer and player of the year, despite his side suffering relegation. In May 2016 he joined Wealdstone, before signing for league rivals Whitehawk in December 2017, following a short loan spell at Enfield Town. Benyon scored on his debut for The Hawks in a 4–1 victory at Eastbourne Borough on 1 January 2018.

Leatherhead
On Tuesday 23 May 2018, Benyon joined Leatherhead  .

Hayes and Yeading
On 22 December 2018, Benyon re-joined Hayes & Yeading United

Oxford City
Benyon joined National League South side Oxford City in October 2019,scoring his first goals for the club against Hornchurch in an FA Trophy replay.

Slough Town
In June 2022, Benyon joined Slough Town.

Career statistics

References

External links

1987 births
Living people
Sportspeople from High Wycombe
English footballers
Association football forwards
Bristol City F.C. players
St Albans City F.C. players
Crawley Town F.C. players
Torquay United F.C. players
Tiverton Town F.C. players
Swindon Town F.C. players
Leatherhead F.C. players
Wycombe Wanderers F.C. players
Southend United F.C. players
Hayes & Yeading United F.C. players
Wealdstone F.C. players
Enfield Town F.C. players
Whitehawk F.C. players
Oxford City F.C. players
Slough Town F.C. players
English Football League players
National League (English football) players
Footballers from Buckinghamshire